Rheingans is a surname. Notable people with the surname include:

Brad Rheingans (born 1999), American wrestler
Gustave Rheingans (1890–1951), American politician and farmer
Penny Rheingans, American computer scientist
Rowan Rheingans, English folk musician